Kal Duzakh-e Do (also Romanized as Kal Dūzakh-e Do; also known as Kaldūzakh-e Do) is a village in Howmeh-ye Sharqi Rural District, in the Central District of Izeh County, Khuzestan Province, Iran. At the 2006 census, its population was 1,152, in 213 families.

References 

Populated places in Izeh County